The Ashland New Plays Festival (ANPF) is a non-profit organization based in Ashland, Oregon, that encourages playwrights in the creation of new works through public readings. The organization was founded in 1992 and is managed by a volunteer board of directors and artistic board,

ANPF's flagship festival is a playwright competition that culminates in the reading of four new plays culled from hundreds of submissions. The festival features professional actors from the Oregon Shakespeare Festival and the community.

In 2011, more than 200 playwrights participated through submissions and at the festival.

The first few festivals were collaborations between local theater groups. As the years passed, the festival grew to draw participants from across the United States. In 2009, management of the festival was taken over by a group of volunteers from the festival's past.

Participants and awards
Playwrights such as David Rambo, Jamie Pachino, Lisa Loomer, and E. M. Lewis have worked with ANPF over the years. Playwright Karen Zacharias received a Helen Hayes Award for her 1999 ANPF-winning play The Sins of Sor Juana. E. M. Lewis's Song of Extinction (ANPF 2008) went on to full productions and won the 2009 Steinberg/ATCA New Play Award as well as first prize in the 2009 EcoDrama Festival in Eugene, Oregon. Lewis also won the 2008 Francesca Primus Prize for an emerging woman playwright.

References

Theatre festivals in the United States
Ashland, Oregon
Tourist attractions in Jackson County, Oregon
1992 establishments in Oregon
Festivals established in 1992